Kordon is a rural locality (a settlement) in Kishertsky District, Perm Krai, Russia. The population was 1,327 as of 2010. There are 24 streets.

Geography 
Kordon is located between Bolshaya and Malaya Molyobka, 51 km east of Ust-Kishert (the district's administrative centre) by road. Burylovo is the nearest rural locality.

References 

Rural localities in Kishertsky District